The 2018 Rhythmic Gymnastics World Championships were held in Sofia, Bulgaria, from 10 September to 16 September 2018 at Arena Armeec. The top three countries in the group all-around, Russia, Italy, and Bulgaria won the first three spots for the 2020 Olympic Games. Russia was the most successful nation of the competition with seven of the nine gold medals, and Bulgaria and Italy each won a title.

On 11 September, Russia's Dina Averina won the first two gold medals of the competition, in the hoop and ball event finals. In the hoop final, Linoy Ashram won the silver medal, the best-ever result for Israel at the Rhythmic Gymnastics World Championships, and in the ball final, Alexandra Agiurgiuculese won Italy's first individual medal in twenty-seven years. Then on 13 September, Averina won the clubs gold medal, and Aleksandra Soldatova won the ribbon gold medal. Milena Baldassarri won the silver medal in the ribbon final, the best-ever result for Italy in the individual events of the Rhythmic Gymnastics World Championships. In the team final, Russia won the gold medal, Bulgaria won a team medal for the first time since 2001 with the silver, and Italy won its first-ever team medal with the bronze. On 14 September, Averina defended her World all-around title ahead of Ashram and Soldatova. Russia won the gold medal in the group all-around, ahead of Italy and Bulgaria. In the group event finals, Bulgaria won gold in 5 hoops, and Italy won gold in 3 balls + 2 ropes.

Participating nations

Medal winners

* reserve gymnast

Medal table

Individual medal table
Individual Finals only

Individual

Team 
The team event took in account the individual qualification results.

Individual Qualification
 The top eight scores in individual apparatus qualified for the apparatus finals, and the top twenty-four total scores advanced to the all-around final.
 Only the three best results (bold) are counted in the total score
 Only the two highest ranking gymnasts from each country can qualify to each one of the finals.

Hoop

Ball

Clubs

Ribbon

All-Around

Groups

Squads

Group All-Around
The top eight scores in each apparatus qualified for the group apparatus finals. The top twenty-four groups in the all-around qualified for the 2019 World Championships in Baku, and the top three groups automatically qualified for the 2020 Olympic Games.

5 Hoops

3 Balls + 2 Ropes

References

External links
 

World Rhythmic Gymnastics Championships
Rhythmic Gymnastics World Championships
International gymnastics competitions hosted by Bulgaria
World Rhythmic Gymnastics Championships
Sports competitions in Sofia
September 2018 sports events in Europe